Southern FM may refer to:

 Heart Sussex, previously known as "Southern FM", in England
 88.3 Southern FM, in Melbourne, Australia